Satara Assembly constituency is one of the 288 Vidhan Sabha (Assembly) constituencies of Maharashtra state in Western India. It is a part of the Satara (Lok Sabha constituency), along with five other assembly constituencies, viz Wai, Karad North, Karad South, Koregaon and Patan from the Satara district.

Members of Legislative Assembly

Election results

Assembly elections 2009

Assembly elections 2014

Assembly elections 2019

See also

 List of constituencies of Maharashtra Legislative Assembly

References

Assembly constituencies of Maharashtra
Satara (city)